Mercy Health is a not-for-profit, integrated, managed care health care organization based in West Michigan. On April 13, 2022, Mercy Health announced it was changing its name to Trinity Health Michigan. Facilities include hospitals, treatment facilities, urgent-care facilities, as well as physician practices that serve the western Michigan area. Mercy Health is a member of the Catholic Trinity Health system.

History
Mercy Health was formed in 2011 with the combining of Saint Mary's Health Care of Grand Rapids and Mercy Health Partners of Muskegon. Mercy Hospital in Cadillac and Mercy Hospital in Grayling were also incorporated into the group. The hospitals in Cadillac and Grayling were purchased by the Munson Healthcare system in February, 2015.

Services
Mercy Health provides inpatient and outpatient services at a variety of locations throughout West Michigan.

Hospitals
 General Campus, Muskegon
 Hackley Campus, Muskegon
 Lakeshore Campus, Shelby, Oceana County
 Mercy Campus, Muskegon
 Saint Mary's Campus, Grand Rapids

Health care providers

Other facilities and services

Awards

References

External links
 Mercy Health official website
 Trinity Health
 Urgent Care Plymouth
 Urgent Care Warren

Hospital networks in the United States
Medical and health organizations based in Michigan
Catholic hospital networks in the United States